James Andrew Gallagher (born September 3, 1985) is an American former professional baseball first baseman and outfielder in minor league baseball organization of the Chicago White Sox of Major League Baseball (MLB). Prior to beginning his professional career, he played college baseball at Duke University. Gallagher has also competed for the United States national baseball team.

Career
Gallagher attended Peters Township High School in McMurray, Pennsylvania and Duke University, where he played college baseball for the Duke Blue Devils baseball team in the Atlantic Coast Conference of the National Collegiate Athletic Association's (NCAA) Division I.

Gallagher was drafted by the Chicago White Sox in the seventh round of the 2007 MLB draft. The White Sox invited him to spring training in 2012.

Gallagher played for the United States national baseball team in the 2011 Pan American Games, winning the silver medal.

References

External links

1985 births
Living people
Baseball first basemen
Baseball outfielders
Baseball players at the 2011 Pan American Games
Baseball players from Pittsburgh
Birmingham Barons players
Charlotte Knights players
Duke Blue Devils baseball players
Great Falls White Sox players
Kannapolis Intimidators players
Pan American Games silver medalists for the United States
Pan American Games medalists in baseball
United States national baseball team players
Winston-Salem Dash players
Medalists at the 2011 Pan American Games